Lane County (standard abbreviation: LE) is a county located in the U.S. state of Kansas. As of the 2020 census, the county population was 1,574, making it the third-least populous county in Kansas. The county seat is Dighton, the only city in the county. The county was named after James H. Lane who was a leader of the Jayhawker abolitionist movement and served as one of the first U.S. senators from Kansas.

History

Early history

For many millennia, the Great Plains of North America was inhabited by nomadic Native Americans.  From the 16th century to 18th century, the Kingdom of France claimed ownership of large parts of North America.  In 1762, after the French and Indian War, France secretly ceded New France to Spain, per the Treaty of Fontainebleau.

19th century
In 1802, Spain returned most of the land to France, but keeping title to about 7,500 square miles.  In 1803, most of the land for modern day Kansas was acquired by the United States from France as part of the 828,000 square mile Louisiana Purchase for 2.83 cents per acre.

In 1854, the Kansas Territory was organized, then in 1861 Kansas became the 34th U.S. state.  In 1873, Lane County was established.

Geography

Adjacent counties
 Gove County (north)
 Ness County (east)
 Finney County (south)
 Scott County (west)

Demographics

As of the census of 2000, there were 2,155 people, 910 households, and 613 families residing in the county.  The population density was 3 people per square mile (1/km2).  There were 1,065 housing units at an average density of 2 per square mile (1/km2).  The racial makeup of the county was 97.73% White, 0.05% Native American, 0.09% Asian, 0.05% Pacific Islander, 0.51% from other races, and 1.58% from two or more races.  1.44% of the population were Hispanic or Latino of any race.

There were 910 households, out of which 29.50% had children under the age of 18 living with them, 59.10% were married couples living together, 5.10% had a female householder with no husband present, and 32.60% were non-families. 30.30% of all households were made up of individuals, and 16.50% had someone living alone who was 65 years of age or older.  The average household size was 2.34 and the average family size was 2.91.

In the county, the population was spread out, with 25.40% under the age of 18, 5.40% from 18 to 24, 24.60% from 25 to 44, 24.10% from 45 to 64, and 20.50% who were 65 years of age or older.  The median age was 42 years. For every 100 females there were 100.30 males.  For every 100 females age 18 and over, there were 97.70 males.

The median income for a household in the county was $36,047, and the median income for a family was $41,892. Males had a median income of $29,429 versus $20,446 for females. The per capita income for the county was $18,606.  About 5.40% of families and 8.20% of the population were below the poverty line, including 11.40% of those under age 18 and 7.60% of those age 65 or over.

Government

Presidential elections
Lane County has been strongly Republican throughout its history, only voting for Democratic candidates five times in presidential elections from 1888 to the present. The most recent of those wins came in 1964 when Lyndon B. Johnson won it amongst his national landslide.

Education

Unified school districts
 Healy USD 468
 Dighton USD 482

Communities

City
 Dighton

Unincorporated communities
† means a Census-Designated Place (CDP) by the United States Census Bureau.
 Alamota
 Amy
 Healy†
 Pendennis
 Shields

Townships
Lane County is divided into five townships.  None of the cities within the county are considered governmentally independent, and all figures for the townships include those of the cities.  In the following table, the population center is the largest city (or cities) included in that township's population total, if it is of a significant size.

See also
 Dry counties

References

Further reading

 Early Lane County History: 12,000 B.C. - A.D. 1884; Ellen May Stanley; Mennonite Press; 1993.
 Standard Atlas of Lane County, Kansas; Geo. A. Ogle & Co; 62 pages; 1920.

External links

County
 
 Lane County - Directory of Public Officials
Maps
 Lane County Maps: Current, Historic, KDOT
 Kansas Highway Maps: Current, Historic, KDOT
 Kansas Railroad Maps: Current, 1996, 1915, KDOT and Kansas Historical Society

 
Kansas counties
1873 establishments in Kansas
Populated places established in 1873